is the 15th single by Japanese duo Pink Lady, released only five days after their previous single "Kiss in the Dark". The song was produced by Robby Adcock, and was recorded in Los Angeles.

The 12" single featured an extended remix of the song, which has subsequently been released on the 2006 "Pink Lady Platinum Box" as "Monday Mona Lisa Club - Special Disco Version".

The single peaked at No. 14 on Oricon's singles chart and was the duo's last top 20 single in their career. It sold 450,000 copies.

Track listing 
All lyrics are written by Yū Aku; all music is composed by Shunichi Tokura.

7" vinyl

12" vinyl

Personnel
 Mie and Kei – vocals
 Steven Hines – keyboard
 Jay Tobin – synthesizer
 Randy Mitchell – guitar
 David Shields – bass
 Alvin Taylor – drums
 Adam Rundolph – percussion
 Charles Merriam – backing vocals
 Tricia Jones – backing vocals
 Kathryn Ward – backing vocals

Chart positions

Cover versions
 The girl group MAX covered this song in the 2008 album AKU YU Vision Factory Compilation ~Writer Life 40th Anniversary~.
 The tribute group Pink Babies covered the song in their "UFO" single in 2017.

References

External links
 
 

1979 singles
1979 songs
Pink Lady (band) songs
Japanese-language songs
Disco songs
Songs with lyrics by Yū Aku
Songs with music by Shunichi Tokura
Victor Entertainment singles